Herbert Francis Wauthier  (10 March 1881 – 24 April 1964) was an English engraver known for his bookplate designs. He was also mayor of the borough of Southgate (1936–37), and a freeman of the City of London.

Family
Wauthier was born in Holborn, London, London. He married Annie Sophia Lucy Luscombe in the Islington district of London in 1907. They had a daughter, Estelle (1921–83), who was mayoress of the London Borough of Enfield 1970–71.

Career
Wauthier was in partnership with Sidney James Hunt (died 30 December 1940) at F. Osborne & Co. Ltd., which later became Wauthier Osborne Guild Ltd. Wauthier was the executor of Hunt's will.

He was also a justice of the peace, a freeman of the Borough of Southgate, chairman of Southgate Urban District Council (1933–34), mayor of the borough of Southgate 1936–37, and a freeman of the City of London and of the Goldsmiths' Company.

Death
Wauthier died on 24 April 1964. He is buried in Southgate Cemetery with his wife Annie (died 24 December 1958), his daughter Estelle, and her husband Anthony John Hayes.

References

Further reading
King, Phylliss. (c. 1951) The bookplates of Herbert Francis Wauthier. Washington, D.C. : American Society of Bookplate Collectors and Designers.
Presswell, Paul T. "Bookplates for F. Osborne & Co. Ltd., latterly Wauthier Osborne Guild Ltd. with particular reference to Herbert Francis Wauthier", The Bookplate Journal, XVI 1, (March 1998), pp. 42–45.

1964 deaths
1881 births
English justices of the peace
English engravers
Mayors of places in Greater London